Frederick Charles Monger (25 January 1863 – 15 November 1919) was an Australian businessman and politician who was a member of the Legislative Assembly of Western Australia from 1892 to 1903 and again from 1905 to 1914, representing the seat of York.  He and his father, John Henry Monger, were the first father–son pair to be elected to the Parliament of Western Australia.

Early life
Monger was born in York, Western Australia, to Henrietta Joaquina (née Manning) and John Henry Monger. Both his father and uncle (Joseph Taylor Monger) were members of the Legislative Council. Monger was sent to Melbourne to be educated, attending Wesley College, and on his return began working for his father. He later involved himself in various mining ventures, and for a period was a joint owner of Wooramel Station (near Carnarvon). Outside of his business interests, Monger was a keen player of Australian rules football, playing two seasons for the Rovers Football Club in the early years of the West Australian Football League (WAFL).

Politics
Monger was elected to the council of the York Municipality in 1892, but resigned later in the year to contest a by-election for the seat of York, which had been vacated by Stephen Henry Parker. He was elected unopposed, and supported the government of John Forrest once he had been sworn in. In 1899, Monger declared bankruptcy, and had to vacate his seat, although he won it back at the subsequent by-election. He was again declared bankrupt in 1903, and was replaced in parliament by Richard Burges, having chosen not to re-contest his seat. Monger returned to parliament in October 1905, following Burges's death. He held York until being defeated by a Country Party candidate, Harry Griffiths, at the 1914 state election. He was again defeated by Griffiths at the 1917 election, and subsequently retired from public life. Monger died in Perth in November 1919, aged 56.

Notes

References

1863 births
1919 deaths
Australian rules footballers from Western Australia
Australian sportsperson-politicians
Members of the Western Australian Legislative Assembly
People educated at Wesley College (Victoria)
People from York, Western Australia
Rovers Football Club players
Western Australian local councillors